Limpopo province of South Africa is divided, for local government purposes, into five district municipalities which are in turn divided into twenty-two local municipalities.

In the following map, the district municipalities are labelled in capital letters and shaded in various different colours.

District municipalities

Local municipalities

Former municipalities
These municipalities have been dissolved since the current system of local government was established in 2000.

References

 
Limpopo
Limpopo-related lists